Oedura nesos is a species of gecko endemic to the Northern Territory in  Australia.

References

Oedura
Geckos of Australia
Reptiles described in 2020